For other ITCC uses, please see ITCC (disambiguation)

The Irish Touring Car Championship. ITCC is a touring car racing series held each year in Ireland. It was established in 2010.

History 
Brian Sexton, Barry Rabbitt and Philip Burdock, the series was created to cater for an obvious gap in the Irish Motor Racing scene as a replacement for the Saloon Libre class which had been run by Mondello Park.

The Irish Touring Car Championship was formed in 2010 by Brian Sexton, Barry Rabbitt and Philip Burdock as a replacement for the Saloon Libre class which had been run by Mondello Park. The series was designed to bring together drivers from various backgrounds, such as other touring car series and time-attack and track day competitors.

Race regulation and format 

The series season consists of 5-6 events, each of which is made up of two rounds. Events are held at Mondello Park, using the International and National Circuits, Bishopscourt Racing Circuit in Northern Ireland. The series has previously held races at the Kirkistown Circuit, also in Northern Ireland, and at the Anglesey Circuit in Wales.

The ITCC series is open to any modified car as long as it is based on a four seater production vehicle. Since the inception the participating classes were divided into Super Touring, Super Touring 2.0 and Touring classes. From the 2019 season the classes were redefined based on power to weight ratio into A, B and C. ITCC is attractive in a way that there are little restrictions on what engine can be fitted or how it may be modified. The air intake and fuel systems, ECU and tyres are all free from restrictions.

From 2021 season, the Production class race in regularity race format, where the barrier lap time is set for each circuit. Penalties apply for exceeding the barrier time - demotion to end of the grid during the qualifying, and 3s time penalty for each time barrier time is exceeded during the race. Production class barrier time for Mondello National Track was 1.04.50, and for Mondello International Track was 2.02.00.

List of champions

Series lap records 
As of 2021

References

External links 
 

Motorsport competitions in Ireland
Touring car racing series
2010 establishments in Ireland
Recurring sporting events established in 2010